Máté Helebrandt (born 12 January 1989 in Nyíregyháza) is a Hungarian racewalker. He competed in the 20 km walk at the 2012 Summer Olympics, where he placed 32nd, and the 2016 Olympics where he came 28th in the same event.

In 2018, he competed in the men's 50 kilometres walk at the 2018 European Athletics Championships held in Berlin, Germany. He did not finish his race. In 2019, he competed in the men's 50 kilometres walk at the 2019 World Athletics Championships held in Doha, Qatar. He did not finish his race.

Helebrandt represented Hungary in the men's 50 kilometres walk at the 2020 Summer Olympics, where he placed 17th and set a season best.

Competition record

References

External links 
 
 
 
 
 

1989 births
Living people
Hungarian male racewalkers
Olympic athletes of Hungary
Athletes (track and field) at the 2012 Summer Olympics
Athletes (track and field) at the 2016 Summer Olympics
People from Nyíregyháza
Athletes (track and field) at the 2020 Summer Olympics
Sportspeople from Szabolcs-Szatmár-Bereg County